The Immaculate Conception Church is a Roman Catholic church in Vidoši, Bosnia and Herzegovina.

References 

Vidosi
Livno
Roman Catholic churches completed in 1856
19th-century Roman Catholic church buildings in Bosnia and Herzegovina